The 2016 Olympic Wrestling European Qualification Tournament was the fourth regional qualifying tournament for the 2016 Olympics. It was held between 15–17 April 2016 in Zrenjanin, Serbia.

The top two wrestlers in each weight class earn a qualification spot for their nation.

Men's freestyle

57 kg
15 April

65 kg
15 April

 Andriy Kviatkovskyi and Magomedmurad Gadzhiev originally qualified for the Olympics, but were later disqualified for doping, giving their spots to David Safaryan and Zurabi Iakobishvili respectively. Later that decision was reverted.

74 kg
16 April

86 kg
16 April

97 kg
17 April

125 kg
17 April

 Alen Zaseyev and Yusup Jalilau originally qualified for the Olympics, but were later disqualified for doping, giving their spots to Dániel Ligeti and Lyuben Iliev respectively.

Men's Greco-Roman

59 kg
15 April

66 kg
15 April

75 kg
16 April

85 kg
16 April

98 kg
17 April

130 kg
17 April

Women's freestyle

48 kg
15 April

53 kg
15 April

58 kg
16 April

 Oksana Herhel originally qualified for the Olympics, but was later disqualified for doping, giving the spot to Mariana Cherdivara. Later that decision was reverted.

63 kg
16 April

69 kg
17 April

75 kg
17 April

References

External links
United World Wrestling

Qualification European
Olympic Qualification Tournament
Wrestling
Wrestling
Sport in Zrenjanin